In mathematics, spin geometry is the area of differential geometry and topology where objects like spin manifolds and Dirac operators, and the various associated index theorems have come to play a fundamental role both in mathematics and in mathematical physics.

An important generalisation is the theory of symplectic Dirac operators in symplectic spin geometry and symplectic topology, which have become important fields of mathematical research.

See also 
 Symplectic topology
 Spinor
 Spinor bundle
 Spin manifold

Books 
 
 

Differential topology
Differential geometry